μ Hydrae, Latinised as Mu Hydrae, is a solitary, orange-hued star in the equatorial constellation of Hydra. It is visible to the naked eye with an apparent visual magnitude of 3.83. Positioned just 1.8° to the south-southwest is the planetary nebula NGC 3242. Mu Hydrae has an annual parallax shift of 13.93 mas, which yields a distance estimate of 234 light years.

This is an evolved K-type giant star with a stellar classification of K4 III, having used up its core hydrogen and has expanded to around 45 times the radius of the Sun. It is a suspected variable star, with a brightness that varies about 0.03 in magnitude. The relatively cool outer atmosphere has an effective temperature of 3999 K.

References

K-type giants
Suspected variables
Hydra (constellation)
Hydrae, Mu
Durchmusterung objects
Hydrae, 42
090432
051069
4094